Peter Larson is an American paleontologist

Peter Larson or Pete Larson may also refer to:
 Pete Larson (American football), (born 1944)
 Peter Larson, co-composer of the off-Broadway musical Brownstone

See also
 Peter Larsen (disambiguation)
 Peter Larsson (disambiguation)
 Larson (surname)